Goldburger is a white Austrian wine grape grown primarily in the Burgenland region. The grape is a crossing of Orangetraube and Welschriesling and was created in 1922 by Fritz Zweigelt at the Höhere Bundeslehranstalt und Bundesamt für Wein- und Obstbau (HBLAuBA) in Klosterneuburg.

Synonyms 
Goldburger is also known under the synonyms Klosterneuburg 16-8 and Orangeriesling.

References

White wine grape varieties
Austrian wine